Fernand Payette (23 August 1921 – 5 September 1993) was a Canadian wrestler. He competed in the men's freestyle light heavyweight at the 1948 Summer Olympics.

References

External links
 

1921 births
1993 deaths
Canadian male sport wrestlers
Olympic wrestlers of Canada
Wrestlers at the 1948 Summer Olympics
Sportspeople from Montreal
20th-century Canadian people